Kithora is a village in Jansath tehsil, near Miranpur town, Uttar Pradesh, India.

It is inhabited by Sayyids of Chhatrudi clan of Barha Sayyids, and home to some beautiful medieval monuments. 

Sayyid Nusratyar Khan, governor of Azimabad (now Patna) in Emperor Muhammad Shah's period (1720 to 1739) belonged to this village.
 

Villages in Muzaffarnagar district